The Third Side of the River is a 2014 Argentine drama film directed by Celina Murga, with Martin Scorsese as an executive producer. The film had its premiere in the competition section of the 64th Berlin International Film Festival.

Cast
 Alian Devetac
 Daniel Veronese

References

External links
 

2014 films
2014 drama films
Argentine drama films
2010s Spanish-language films
2010s Argentine films